Schwarz Etienne is a Swiss luxury watch brand, founded in 1902 by Paul Arthur Schwarz and his wife Olga Etienne.

History
In 1902, Paul Arthur Schwarz and his wife Olga Etienne created a fabrique in La Chaux-de-Fonds and its name is a combination of their surnames. The company owned brands such as Venus or Alpha.
The brand is acquired in 2003 by Raffaello Radicchi who soon initiated an action a plan to develop and produce movements in-house.

Watches
Modern watches of the brand are Haute Horlogerie, manufactured in-house including their movements. At BaselWorld 2017, the brand introduced a Tourbillon with retrograde seconds indication.

See also
 List of watch manufacturers

References

External links
Xavier Markl, Monochrome watches, Schwarz Etienne Manufacture discovery
Flore Amos et Valère Gogniat, Le Temps, Schwarz Etienne Start-up centenaire
Joel Grandjean, watchonista, watchmaking legend rises from ashes 

Watch manufacturing companies of Switzerland
Swiss watch brands
Privately held companies of Switzerland